Plano is a CDP in Warren County, Kentucky, United States. The population at the 2020 census was 1,223. The elevation is 610 feet.

Geography
Plano is located at coordinates 36°52'40"N 86°24'58"W. According to the United States Census Bureau, Plano has a total area of 2.67 km2 of which 2.66 km2 is land and (0.39%) 0.01 km2 is water.

Demographics

According to the 2010 census, there were 1,117 people living in Plano. The population density was 417.9 inhabitants/km2. Of the 1,117 people, Plano was composed of 94.09% White, 3.04% African American, 0% Native American, 0.9% Asian, 0% Pacific Islander, 0.81% were other races, and 1.16% of two or more races. 1.61% are Hispanic or Latino of any race.

Services
Plano has a volunteer fire department. There is also a convenience store, Plano Country Store. In late 2019, a Dollar General was built where Ruben’s Garage used to be. Plano is also the home of Plano Elementary School, whose team name is the Panthers. There is also G.H. Freeman Park, a public park which has volleyball, horseshoes, a walking track, and two cabanas.

Notable people
 
 
Roy S. Kelley (1915–1993), United States Army engineer

References

Further reading
 

Census-designated places in Kentucky
Census-designated places in Warren County, Kentucky